The North Toronto Players is a theatre group, founded in 1966 as the St. Timothy Players. Their productions are staged at Papermill Theatre, at historic Todmorden Mills on Pottery Road in East York, Toronto.

Productions
While they are mostly known for their Gilbert & Sullivan work, the Company also creates their own productions.  Among these is H.M.S. Starship Pinafore: The Next Generation, a Star Trek adaptation of two famous Gilbert and Sullivan operettas (HMS Pinafore and Trial by Jury).

References
 HMS Starship Pinafore : The Next Generation playbill, Feb.-March, 2004 (Toronto).

External links
 North Toronto Players

Theatre companies in Toronto